The Great Northern Railway (Ireland) class S was a class of five 4-4-0 steam locomotive that the Great Northern Railway introduced in 1913 to haul Belfast – Dublin express passenger trains. They were followed two years later by the three similar class S2 locomotives.

All were built by Beyer, Peacock and Company at their Gorton Foundry, Manchester.

Fleet

Names
The locomotives were delivered during a time when the GNRI was removing names from locomotives. The S class locomotives carried names from new, but gradually lost them, so by 1925, only 170 Errigal retained its name. This it lost in 1930. The S2 locomotives were allocated the names Lugnaquilla, Carlingford, and Mount Hamilton, but they were never carried. With the introduction the class V locomotives in 1932, the GNRI revived the practice of naming locomotives; the S2 class acquired new names, and the S class regained their old ones as they went through the works for rebuilding in the late 1930s. All were named after mountains in Ireland.

1958 dispersal
Much of the GNR network was closed in 1957 and the remaining system was split between Córas Iompair Éireann (CIÉ) and the Ulster Transport Authority (UTA) in 1958, with the fleet divided as equally as possible between the two parties. The UTA renumbered their locomotives, whereas the CIÉ merely added an "N" suffix to the locomotives' former GNRI numbers.

CIÉ soon replaced its remaining steam locomotives with diesels and sold four of its former GNRI steam locomotives – all three S class and one VS class – to the UTA in 1963.

The UTA based some of its S class locomotives in Belfast and used it to haul trains on the Belfast – Portadown main line and Portadown – Derry "Derry Road".

Preservation
One member of the class, No. 171 Slieve Gullion, is preserved. In preservation it has covered most of the Irish railway system, including many non-GNR(I) lines.

The locomotive was in service until 2002 when its boiler certificate expired. Growing Rural Opportunities Within (GROW) South Antrim is now funding the locomotive's restoration. In January 2014 the locomotive was transported to Railway Restoration North East Ltd in Shildon, County Durham, which began overhaul until they went insolvent.  The locomotive was rescued and returned to Whitehead and put in store in 2015.  

As of September 2019, overhaul has recommenced at Whitehead, with boiler being lifted in October, and wheels removed from frames at the same time to allow wheels to be reprofiled, axle box work, and further work on the motion.  

It is intended that 171 replaces 85 when its boiler ticket expires.

Model
An 00 gauge model of the S Class is currently available as an etched-brass kit from Studio Scale Models. It includes transfers, brass etches and cast white metal parts.

See also
 Steam locomotives of Ireland

References

Sources and further reading

4-4-0 locomotives
5 ft 3 in gauge locomotives
Beyer, Peacock locomotives
S
Passenger locomotives
Railway locomotives introduced in 1913
2′B h2 locomotives
Steam locomotives of Ireland
Steam locomotives of Northern Ireland